Barloni is a village in Madha tehsil of Solapur district in Maharashtra state of India.

References

Villages in Solapur district